Töyrynummi (Finnish), Lidamalmen (Swedish) is a northern neighborhood of Helsinki, Finland.

Politics
Results of the 2011 Finnish parliamentary election in Töyrynummi:

National Coalition Party   25.0%
Social Democratic Party   23.3%
True Finns   19.2%
Green League   11.4%
Left Alliance   7.6%
Centre Party   5.6%
Christian Democrats   3.2%
Swedish People's Party   2.1%

Neighbourhoods of Helsinki